Kananaskis Village is an unincorporated community in Alberta's Rockies within the Kananaskis Country park system in the Kananaskis Improvement District of Alberta, Canada. The community is located on the west shore of the Kananaskis River at the base of Mount Kidd.

The village was the host of the 28th G8 summit in 2002.

Kananaskis Improvement District's municipal office is located in Kananaskis Village.

Attractions 
Kananaskis Village is a resort community. It features hotel-style accommodation and numerous amenities. Amenities include a 36-hole golf course (Kananaskis Country Golf Course), downhill skiing (Nakiska Ski Area), equestrian facilities (Boundary Ranch), and trails for hiking, mountain cycling, and cross-country skiing.

See also 
List of communities in Alberta

References 

Localities in Kananaskis Improvement District